Nebraska Initiative 416 was a 2000 ballot initiative that amended the Nebraska Constitution to make it unconstitutional for the state to recognize or perform same-sex marriage, same-sex civil unions or domestic partnerships. The referendum was approved on November 7, 2000, by 70% of the voters. The initiative has since been struck down in federal court and same-sex marriage is now legally recognised in the state of Nebraska.

Text of amendment
The text of the amendment states:
Only marriage between a man and a woman shall be valid or recognized in Nebraska. The uniting of two persons of the same sex in a civil union, domestic partnership, or other similar same-sex relationship shall not be valid or recognized in Nebraska.
Those voting yes were voting in favour of the amendment and those voting no were voting against the amendment.

Campaign
The petition drive that put the proposed amendment on the Nebraska ballot was organized by Guyla Mills, director of Nebraska Family Council. Mills said of her organization's motives: "This is not about hate, this is about love. The Defense of Marriage Act movement was just a platform we had to share the love of Jesus Christ."

A group called the Coalition for Protection of Marriage ran advertisements in support of the marriage ban. The coalition was chaired by former governor Kay Orr and Omaha businessman Bill Ramsey. Dan Parsons of  Family First served as coalition spokesman. The LDS Church and Nebraska Catholic Conference were also coalition members.

The proposed amendment was opposed by United Students against 416, a group of University of Nebraska students, and by the Nebraska Coalition for Gay and Lesbian Civil Rights.

Result

Lawsuits
Several gay and lesbian advocacy organizations challenged this measure in Citizens for Equal Protection v. Bruning. In 2005, Judge Joseph Bataillon of the United States District Court for the District of Nebraska ruled that the measure violated the United States Constitution's guarantees of equal protection and free speech, as well as its prohibition on bills of attainder. In 2006, the United States Court of Appeals for the Eighth Circuit overturned Judge Bataillon and ruled that "laws limiting the state-recognized institution of marriage to heterosexual couples ... do not violate the Constitution of the United States."

In 2015, in the matter of Waters v. Ricketts, Judge  of the District Court again ruled that the measure violated the U.S. Constitution, on equal protection and due process grounds. Though the state appealed and successfully sought a stay of the ruling to the Eighth Circuit Court of Appeals, the United States Supreme Court struck down same-sex marriage bans nationwide on identical grounds in the matter of Obergefell v. Hodges. Consequently, the Eighth Circuit Court lifted the stay of Judge 's ruling and Initiative 416 was formally struck down, with Nebraska officials and agencies formally enjoined from enforcing the ban on same-sex marriage in the state.

Status
Following Obergefell v. Hodges the text of Initiative 416 is dead letter and is not enforced. It remains a part of the constitution.

The Nebraska Family Alliance and Nebraska Catholic Conference continue to oppose efforts to remove the text of Initiative 416 from the Constitution following the court rulings. Governor Pete Ricketts vetoed a bill to print marriages licenses to accommodate same-sex couples in 2019.

See also
Same-sex marriage in Nebraska
LGBT rights in Nebraska
U.S. state constitutional amendments banning same-sex unions

References

New York Times coverage, October 21, 2009

2000 ballot measures
2000 in LGBT history
2000 Nebraska elections
Initiatives in the United States
LGBT history in Nebraska
Nebraska ballot measures
Nebraska law
Same-sex marriage ballot measures in the United States
U.S. state constitutional amendments banning same-sex unions